Two total lunar eclipses occurred in 1967: 

 24 April 1967 lunar eclipse
 18 October 1967 lunar eclipse

See also 
 List of 20th-century lunar eclipses
 Lists of lunar eclipses